Clinton Gregory (born March 1, 1964 in Martinsville, Virginia) is an American country and bluegrass singer, songwriter, and fiddler. He has recorded primarily on independent labels, and has charted eleven singles on the Billboard Hot Country Singles & Tracks (now known as Hot Country Songs) charts. His highest charting single is "Play, Ruby, Play", which reached No. 25.

Biography

Clinton Gregory began playing the fiddle at age five; by age six, he was performing at bluegrass festivals. At age twelve, he and his family moved to Nashville, Tennessee, where his father, Willie Gregory, performed on the Grand Ole Opry. Clinton later became a session musician, playing fiddle for Suzy Bogguss and other acts. In 1990, he was signed to Step One Records. While on Step One, he recorded three albums and charted several singles on the U.S. Billboard Hot Country Songs charts, becoming the first independent act in over a decade to reach the Top 30 on the U.S. country charts. He also won the Music Row Industry's Independent Artist of the Year award for 1992 and 1993. Clinton later recorded two albums for Rock Bottom Records and one for Polydor Records.

Discography

Albums

Singles

Music videos

References

External links
Official website

1964 births
American country singer-songwriters
American country fiddlers
Living people
Singer-songwriters from Virginia
Polydor Records artists
Step One Records artists
People from Martinsville, Virginia
20th-century American singers
21st-century American singers